Pierrefonds is a commune in the Oise department in northern France, known for the Château de Pierrefonds.

See also
 Château de Pierrefonds
 Communes of the Oise department

References

External links

 

Communes of Oise